Lotbinière is a regional county municipality in the Chaudière-Appalaches region of Quebec. It is an almost exclusively rural RCM, with no village with a population above 4,000. As of the 2016 Canadian Census, the RCM had a population of 31,741. Its seat is in Sainte-Croix.

Subdivisions
There are 18 subdivisions within the RCM:

Municipalities (14)
 Dosquet
 Leclercville
 Lotbinière
 Saint-Agapit
 Saint-Antoine-de-Tilly
 Saint-Apollinaire
 Sainte-Agathe-de-Lotbinière
 Sainte-Croix
 Saint-Flavien
 Saint-Gilles
 Saint-Janvier-de-Joly
 Saint-Patrice-de-Beaurivage
 Saint-Sylvestre
 Val-Alain

Parishes (3)
 Notre-Dame-du-Sacré-Cœur-d'Issoudun
 Saint-Édouard-de-Lotbinière
 Saint-Narcisse-de-Beaurivage

Villages (1)
 Laurier-Station

Demographics

Language
Mother tongue from 2016 Canadian Census

Transportation

Access Routes
Highways and numbered routes that run through the municipality, including external routes that start or finish at the county border:

 Autoroutes
 

 Principal Highways
 
 

 Secondary Highways
 
 
 
 
 
 

 External Routes
 None

See also
 List of regional county municipalities and equivalent territories in Quebec

References

External links
  Lotbinière Regional County

 
Quebec City Area